Bhuvanaikabahu I was King of Dambadeniya in the 13th century, who ruled from 1271 to 1283. He succeeded his brother Vijayabahu IV as King of Dambadeniya and an Interregnum of 19 years is thought to have occurred after his death. His nephew Parakkamabahu III ruled from Polonnaruwa, and was not formally considered as a King of Dambadeniya.

Bhuvanaikabahu I is known to have resided in Yapahuwa.

Relations with Egypt 
Historical chronicles record that king Bhuvanaikabahu sent an embassy to the Mamluk Sultanate in early 1283 with the aim of forming an alliance.

See also
 List of Sri Lankan monarchs
 History of Sri Lanka

References

External links
 Kings & Rulers of Sri Lanka
 Codrington's Short History of Ceylon

Monarchs of Dambadeniya
House of Siri Sanga Bo
B
B